Roberto D'Amico (born 2 December 1961) is an Italian bobsledder. He competed in the four man event at the 1988 Winter Olympics.

References

External links
 

1961 births
Living people
Italian male bobsledders
Olympic bobsledders of Italy
Bobsledders at the 1988 Winter Olympics
People from Cortina d'Ampezzo
Sportspeople from the Province of Belluno